Center Township is an inactive township in Hickory County, in the U.S. state of Missouri.

Center Township was established in 1845, and named for its location near the county's geographical center.

References

Townships in Missouri
Townships in Hickory County, Missouri